Oscar Jaime Llaneta Florencio (born February 5, 1966) is a Catholic bishop and the current bishop of the Military Ordinariate of the Philippines.

Biography
Oscar Jaime Llaneta Florencio was ordained a priest on April 3, 1990. He studied Philosophy at the Sacred Heart Seminary, in Palo, and Theology at the University of Santo Tomas, in Manila. He earned the Doctorate in Theology at the Pontifical University of the Holy Cross in 1999.

On July 3, 2015, Pope Francis appointed him Auxiliary Bishop of Cebu and Titular Bishop of Lestrona. He was consecrated bishop on September 4, 2015 by John Forrosuelo Du, Archbishop of Palo. Co-consecrators were Giuseppe Pinto, Apostolic Nunciature to the Philippines; and Jose Serofia Palma, Archbishop of Cebu. He was previously rector and at the same time a theology professor of St. John the Evangelist School of Theology.

On July 5, 2017, the Pope named Florencio as the apostolic administrator of the Military Ordinariate Philippines (MOP) after the demise of Most. Rev. Leopoldo S. Tumulak, D.D., its sixth bishop. The MOP serves as a personal diocese for the men and women of the Armed Forces of the Philippines, the Philippine National Police, the Philippine Coast Guard, the Bureau of Fire Protection, and the Bureau of Jail Management and Penology. He was eventually appointed as the seventh bishop of the Military Ordinariate of the Philippines.

References

External links

1966 births
Living people
People from Leyte (province)
Bishops appointed by Pope Francis

Pontifical University of the Holy Cross alumni